Harry Hill's TV Burp (also known as just TV Burp) was a British television comedy programme broadcast between 2001 and 2012 on ITV1. The show was produced by Avalon Television and was written and hosted by comedian Harry Hill. Each episode took a humorous look back at the previous week of programming on British television.

Much of the format of the show was centred on comedy that was derived from a selection of clips taken from a week's worth of programming on British television, both from terrestrial and digital channels, which were often combined with studio segments, spoof scenes and sketches, with the host sometimes involved in the humour derived from them. Clips that featured were sourced from a variety of shows across most channels throughout the week before the broadcast of each episode, with soaps, dramas and popular factual series being the most commonly represented genres.

Format
Comedy created from clips is usually acquired from outside of the context of their original programme and with only limited information about the scene given, as the focus of the show's treatment is often on the unintentional humour which can be picked out from the scene they show - from something that is spoken out by a character or a real-life person, something humorous that happened in the clip, or something pointed out by the host - which can usually be accompanied by a spoof scene or sketch that often involves the host performing alongside a character from the scene, a guest performer, or a stand-in actor portraying a character from the show or a notable figure in the media.

An example of this can be that a portion of the original scene is shown, before it cuts to the spoof scene, whereupon the host jumps into the scene and gets involved in a slapstick fight with the people from the show. All studio segments shown on the programme, usually feature the host commenting lightheartedly or sarcastically about the actual intended content of the programme, and sometimes involves him using props that are based upon those from the clips shown, sometimes being mock-ups of actual items from the original programme, while sketches and spoof scenes can range from mock-ups of behind-the-scenes actions, or based upon something mentioned in a clip.

Recurring elements
Throughout the series, TV Burp featured a considerable number of recurring elements, of which some became staple parts of the show in the later series:

 In the opening studio segment for each part of the episode, Hill would create a small selection of humorous TV headlines, each one creating a subject based on the content of a clip that supported it; an example would be how a person found in a programme was able to move while simply standing on the spot, due to the unexpected effect created by the camera panning in the clip. In the earlier series, some of the clips used were not from programmes, but from home videos.
 Starting from Series 8, the show would often open to Hill pretending to be a little unaware he was on air, before later series saw him supposedly conversing with somebody who is out of shot before noticing he was on air, exclaiming "Oh!" in realization and quickly starting the show. In later series, the second part of each episode opened with Hill simply nodding his head to the final note of the show's theme, following the commercial break.
 Hill often performs a sideways looks to another camera, either during a studio segment or just after a clip has been shown, in which he gives a cheeky, risqué or sarcastic remark/expression.
 A fight sketch is used in every episode to introduce the commercial break. The setup for it is that Hill claims to like two items, which were introduced in one or two clips prior to the break, wonders how to determine which is better, and decides that a fight between them is necessary, often with the typical line of: "Well, I like 'x' and I like 'y'. But which is better? There's only one way to find out... FIGHT!" The items in question, whether they be people, animals or actual items (i.e. a food dish), would then appear from doors on either side of the studio and begin fighting in front of Hill's desk, with him saying "Go on 'x'!" or "Go on 'y'!", followed by "See you after the break" and him cheering the item he favoured the most. After the commercial break, the show continues as normal, making no reference to the fight or who won it.

 In some later series, the fight was either one-sided and instantly over, or something occurred to make it not happen. During its broadcast on Cartoon Network, the channel featured a mock version of the sketch involving the two letters of its logo, 'C' and 'N', fighting each other during the adverts, but not in the episodes.

 Every episode featured at least one clip that was used as a highlight, in which something funny that occurred within it was pointed out by Hill. This segment always had a title card played before and after the clip that was to be shown, depicting the style of the highlight in the form of a title, which was sung out in a jingle. The most common forms of comedic highlights used in the show included:
 TV Highlight of the Week - A simple highlight of something mundane, for example a short, brief exchange of simple greetings.
 TV Expert of the Week - An expert who asserts a fact as if it is deeply significant when it is in fact blatantly obvious.
 TV Burp Poetry Corner - A clip of unintentional rhyming done in a programme.
 This Week's (show name) In A Nutshell - A short summing up of a programme's episode in a simple ten-fifteen second clip
 I Beg Your Pardon of the Week - Someone saying something in such a way that they cannot be understood
 TV Burp Stars of Tomorrow: Today - An extra in a programme, sometimes immobile, who Hill thinks will have a big career in the future.
 In most of the later series, a recurring gag or theme would be used in either a few episodes, the entire run of a series, or in later series.  The most notable of these gags included:
 Hill using an identical phone to that used in Deal or No Deal by the Banker, to call Noel Edmonds, often with humorous results. Only occurred in Series 7.
 Hill comparing an item in a clip to that of a person in the same clip.
 A spoof show involving the judges from Pop Idol titled "At Home with the Pop Idol Judges", with Hill starring as Simon Cowell. Only occurred in Series 3.
 While mocking clips from the BBC Three show Freaky Eaters, which examined unusual eating habits of the public, Hill would announce what a person on the show ate in a loud, simplistic gurn, many with comic adaptations, such as "beans", "chippy chips", "sausages!" and "hoopy hoops" (Harry later dropped this act as he deemed it too childish).
 A competition involving The Knitted character, turning up in programs, in which viewers had to find him; occurred in Series 10.
 A knitting competition, designed as a spoof talent show entitled "The K Factor: So You Think You Can Knit?", in which viewers submitted their knitted items to be judged by "knitted" judges; TV Burp created its own items for this, merely as jokes. Only occurred in Series 11.
 Comparing catch phrases in a game show to that of (former) game show, Hole in the Wall - "Bring On The Wall".
 Hill comparing himself to people who were bald and on some occasions also wore glasses like him in a programme featured on the show, often with the lines "I don't know what it is about them, but..."; the person in question sometimes appeared in person next to the host in the comparison.
 A shark puppet attacking Hill by springing out of props next to him at his desk. Only occurred in Series 8.
 Throughout its history, TV Burp featured a number of characters that were created just for the show, some in a minor capacity, while others had more prominent appearances. The most notable of these included:
The Knitted Character - a knitted toy which featured very briefly in EastEnders, is implied to be part of the TV Burp staff and holds a rivalry with Peggy Mitchell (Barbara Windsor).
Heather - a spoof version of EastEnders character Heather Trott (Cheryl Fergison), played by Steve Benham and portrayed as fat, lazy, but most of the time, very helpful
Alan Sugar - a ventriloquist dummy that Hill uses when discussing clips from The Apprentice, which was made up to look like the real Alan Sugar.
 A recurring element from the 2010 series was "Wagbo", the 1980s "love child" of The X Factor contestants Mary Byrne and Wagner. Wagbo "escaped" from his cage while exhibited on the show and ran amok throughout the nation, including rampages at Bluewater, the O2 Arena, and an appearance by Robert Downey Jr. He was eventually "recaptured" after a chase through the sets of This Morning, Lorraine, Dancing on Ice, The Alan Titchmarsh Show and Loose Women. Along the way, he kissed Phillip Schofield, Lorraine Kelly and Pamela Stephenson, was hit by Stephenson, assaulted by Alan Titchmarsh with a baseball bat, and chased from Loose Women by Andrea McLean, Coleen Nolan, Jo Joyner and Lynda Bellingham, as well as  interrupting a warning about his rampage on Daybreak, terrorising hosts Adrian Chiles and Christine Bleakley. Wagbo and his brother, Logbo (son of Mary and Louis Walsh), were eventually shot dead by the Knitted Character after beating up Hill in the studio. From thereon, Wagbo occasionally appeared in the show as part of a scene or end-of-show song.
 In most of the episodes, the show would end with a musical performance of a song, sung by one or multiple people - either a celebrity performing as themselves or in character, or a real-life person - with Hill joining in on the song occasionally with the song ending on a "cha-cha-cha" staccato ending.

Production
Following a successful pilot broadcast on 22 December 2001, a series was commissioned, starting on 14 November 2002. Production of an episode often involved Hill and his programme's associate writing team, including Brenda Gilhooly, Paul Hawksbee, Daniel Maier, Joe Burnside, David Quantick and Madeleine Brettingham, watching significant amounts of television, much on preview tapes. Throughout Series 1 to 9, the show was recorded before a live audience in Studio 1 of Teddington Studios, South-West London, but from Series 10 to the final episode of Series 15, recording was relocated to BBC Television Centre in Studio 4. The first two series of the show were broadcast within a late night slot on Thursdays, with Series 1 being the only series not to feature clips from the BBC's EastEnders; Hill was required, during the series, to accompany his comments on the British soap with either crude animation, courtroom-style sketches or staged comic re-enactments of scenes from the show. Whilst the show was well received, the scheduling was criticised due to the family-friendly humour, leading to the third series receiving a teatime repeat slot on Sundays. Starting from the fourth series, the show moved to a Saturday teatime slot, and then later to a Saturday primetime slot.

Due to the inclusion of a large amount of material to which ITV and Avalon do not hold the rights, repeats of past TV Burp episodes were rare outside immediate broadcast repeats. However, in 2009, The Best of TV Burp was introduced, which featured clips from previous episodes, while additionally, new episodes were also made available to view online on the ITV Player service after original transmission. As of 7 April 2012, 24 'Best of TV Burp' episodes have been aired, in addition to a Best of Christmas TV Burp episode on 25 December 2010, featuring clips from previous Christmas episodes of the show. On 28 October 2011, Cartoon Network began airing a similar format (along with Shark Infested Custard), in which they took past episodes of the series and edited segments together to make the series more child-friendly, but did not record new segments for this version, with the exception of the trailer.

Following months of speculation, Hill confirmed to his studio audience at the taping of the final episode of Series 15 that it would be his last. In October 2013 Gold began airing re-runs of the show starting with the third series. The titles of the show were briefly featured as part of London 2012's opening ceremony.

Criticism
In 2007, Ofcom ruled that TV Burp had breached guidelines by including clips of a Bear Grylls programme which featured Grylls eating a frog and cooking a turtle; Ofcom ruled that the clips were 'inappropriately scheduled' given the offence they could potentially cause viewers when taken outside the context of the whole Grylls programme.

In 2008, "The Best of TV Burp 3" included footage originally broadcast in 2004, which lampooned Sky reality series The Real Mrs Robinson. ITV and Avalon were not aware that two of the participants in the programme had died between the original broadcast and the 'Best of'. However, Sky's licence to use the footage made no mention of this, and the participants were not referred to by their full names in the footage, restricting TV Burp's ability to research the case ahead of putting the programme to air. After complaints were made to ITV and Ofcom, the programme was voluntarily re-edited such that the segment was removed from all further broadcasts. Ofcom did not uphold a complaint made by relatives of the deceased, stating that whilst it recognised that the broadcast of the footage would have been distressing to the family, the manner of the broadcast did not breach the broadcasting regulations.

A 2016 broadcast on Dave, of an episode originally screened by ITV in December 2008, featured a comedic review of a Channel 4 documentary about Thomas Beatie. UKTV had edited out around a minute of the segment ahead of broadcast, but much of the skit remained. Complainants felt the treatment was offensive to the transgender community; Ofcom ruled the complaints had been resolved by way of UKTV voluntarily cutting the entire section on Beatie's film, preventing it from future broadcast on their channels.

Reception and awards
TV Burp received positive feedback from critics and viewers; Mark Lawson from The Guardian said it was "The freshest and most original show in mainstream television." In 2008, visitors to the British Comedy Guide website voted TV Burp as the "Best British TV Panel Show/Satire of 2008". Viewing figures for the show in its primetime slot were considerably high and achieved a considerable share of the audience - Series 8 averaged 6.1 million viewers during its run, taking an average share of around 25.1% of the audience for its timeslot, compared to Series 14 and 15 which averaged 4.9 million viewer and an average audience share of 19.3%. One of its highest-rated episodes, achieved 8 million viewers and took a 32% audience share.

In 2007, Harry Hill's TV Burp was nominated for Best Comedy Entertainment Programme at the 2007 British Comedy Awards, while in 2008, it won two British Academy Television Awards for Best Entertainment Performance (for Harry Hill) and Best Entertainment programme, and in 2009 won Harry Hill another BAFTA for Best Entertainment Performance.

Transmissions

Series

Specials
From 2005 to 2011, the biennial BBC One transmission of the Red Nose Day telethon in aid of Comic Relief has included a short TV Burp segment. He also recorded a short TV Burp segment for Blue Peter in February 2009.

Footnotes

Merchandise
As per repeats, it was initially thought that a DVD release of TV Burp would be unlikely. However, a DVD titled Harry Hill's TV Burp Gold was eventually released in November 2008. Three other DVDs have since been released, as detailed below, with additional content from the show. A complete series-by-series release still appears unlikely. A TV Burp book was also released in 2009.

See also
The Soup, a similar show in the US

References

External links

Harry Hill's official site
TV Burp Gold official site
Avalon Television - TV Burp

2000s British satirical television series
2010s British satirical television series
2001 British television series debuts
2012 British television series endings
BAFTA winners (television series)
British television shows featuring puppetry
ITV comedy
Television series about television
English-language television shows
Television shows shot at Teddington Studios
Harry Hill